Goniurosaurus kwangsiensis, sometimes known as the Guangxi cave gecko,  is a gecko endemic to China.

References

Goniurosaurus
Reptiles of China
Reptiles described in 2015